Acropora hemprichii is a species of acroporid coral that was first described by Christian Gottfried Ehrenberg in 1834. The species is listed as vulnerable on the IUCN Red List, and has a decreasing population. It is common with a wide range, and is listed on Appendix II of CITES.

Description
Acropora hemprichii lives in colonies of densely-packed branches, which are flat or upward-facing. The axial corallites are rounded and shaped like domes, and the incipient axial corallites are present on some specimens. The radial corallites are cone-shaped irregularly spaced, have smooth walls, and are large. It has a smooth coenosteum, and the species is mainly brown or pink-brown. From specimens in the Red Sea, this species has been shown to live for between thirteen and 24 years. It is composed of aragonite.

Distribution
Acropora hemprichii is common but only found in a small area; the Gulf of Aden, the Red Sea, the Philippines, and the Indian Ocean. Despite being affected by bleaching, in the northern areas of the Red Sea, the species has avoided most bleaching, with only 6% of reefs being destroyed over recent decades. However, the species did not survive as well in the southern areas of the Red Sea. The species first existed between 0.78 and 0.13 myr ago. There is no known population for it, but numbers are believed to be decreasing, and the species is affected by disease, bleaching by sea temperature rises, fishing, human infrastructure, and is prey to Acanthaster planci. It is listed as vulnerable on the IUCN Red List, and appears on CITES Appendix II.

Taxonomy
It was first described by Christian Gottfried Ehrenberg in 1834 as Heteropora hemprichii, before being re-classified as Acropora hemprichi.

References

Acropora
Cnidarians of the Pacific Ocean
Cnidarians of the Indian Ocean
Fauna of the Red Sea
Marine fauna of Africa
Marine fauna of Asia
Vulnerable animals
Vulnerable biota of Africa
Vulnerable fauna of Asia
Corals described in 1834
Taxa named by Christian Gottfried Ehrenberg